Electronic Caregiver Tower (formerly Las Cruces Tower, Wells Fargo Tower and First National Bank Tower) is a skyscraper located on 506 Main Street in Las Cruces, New Mexico. It opened in 1962 and was originally planned to be only 7 stories tall. Wells Fargo bought the building in 2001 and renamed it, after acquiring First National Bank's parent company. The building has 3 elevators (originally Otis, modernized by Dover); there are restrooms on every floor but the lobby and basement.

References 

Wells Fargo buildings
Skyscrapers in New Mexico
Skyscraper office buildings in New Mexico
Buildings and structures in Las Cruces, New Mexico
1962 establishments in New Mexico
Office buildings completed in 1962